Luther Hirini (born 27 July 1996) is a New Zealand rugby union player. He generally plays in the wing or fullback positions but can also play as a centre.

A product of Feilding High School, Hirini plays for the Feilding Old Boys-Oroua club.

Hirini was involved in the Hurricanes U18 team in 2014.

He was a part of the Manawatu academy in 2015.

He made his provincial debut coming off the bench on 24 September 2016 in the 30–19 loss to Taranaki.

His father, Paul, played as a centre for Horowhenua-Kapiti and Manawatu.

References 

1996 births
People educated at Feilding High School
Living people
Manawatu rugby union players
Rugby union fullbacks